Hilferty is a surname. Notable people with the surname include:

Daniel J. Hilferty (born 1956), American businessman
Robert Hilferty (1959–2009), American journalist, filmmaker and AIDS activist
Stephanie Hilferty (born 1985), American politician
Susan Hilferty (born 1953), American costume designer

Anglicised Irish-language surnames
Surnames of British Isles origin